This is a list of awards and nominations received by Got7, a South Korean boy band formed by JYP Entertainment, since their debut in 2014. The group has received a total of 57 awards out of 187 nominations.


Awards and nominations

Other accolades

Listicles

Notes

References

Awards
Got7